

Day 1 (August 29) 
 Seeds out:
 Men's Singles:  Richard Gasquet [13],  Martin Kližan [28]
 Women's Singles:  Barbora Strýcová [18],  Irina-Camelia Begu [21],  Sara Errani [27],  Coco Vandeweghe [28],  Misaki Doi [30],  Monica Puig [32]
 Schedule of Play

Day 2 (August 30) 
 Seeds out:
 Men's Singles:  David Goffin [12],  Bernard Tomic [17],  Philipp Kohlschreiber [25],  Sam Querrey [29]
 Women's Singles:  Kiki Bertens [20],  Daria Kasatkina [23],  Ana Ivanovic [29]
 Schedule of Play

Day 3 (August 31) 
 Seeds out:
 Men's Singles:  Milos Raonic [5],  Pablo Cuevas [18],  Albert Ramos-Viñolas [31],  Benoît Paire [32]
 Women's Singles:  Garbiñe Muguruza [3],  Svetlana Kuznetsova [9]
 Men's Doubles:  Ivan Dodig /  Marcelo Melo [2],  Julien Benneteau /  Édouard Roger-Vasselin [11],  Juan Sebastián Cabal /  Robert Farah [13],  Radek Štěpánek /  Nenad Zimonjić [16]
 Mixed Doubles:  Raquel Atawo /  Jean-Julien Rojer [4]
 Schedule of Play

Day 4 (September 1) 
 Seeds out:
 Men's Singles:  Feliciano López [16],  Steve Johnson [19],  Alexander Zverev [27],  Gilles Simon [30]
 Women's Singles:  Timea Bacsinszky [15],  Samantha Stosur [16]
 Men's Doubles:  Daniel Nestor /  Vasek Pospisil [6],  Treat Huey /  Max Mirnyi [9]
 Schedule of Play

Day 5 (September 2) 
 Seeds out:
 Men's Singles:  Marin Čilić [7],  Roberto Bautista Agut [15],  John Isner [20],  Kevin Anderson [23]
 Women's Singles:  Dominika Cibulková [12],  Elina Svitolina [22],  Belinda Bencic [24]
 Men's Doubles:  Pablo Cuevas /  Marcel Granollers [14],  Oliver Marach /  Fabrice Martin [15]
 Women's Doubles:  Chan Hao-ching /  Chan Yung-jan [2],  Raquel Atawo /  Abigail Spears [9],  Darija Jurak /  Anastasia Rodionova [14],  Kiki Bertens /  Johanna Larsson [15]
 Mixed Doubles:  Lucie Hradecká /  Marcin Matkowski [8]
 Schedule of Play

Day 6 (September 3) 
 Seeds out:
 Men's Singles:  David Ferrer [11],  Nick Kyrgios [14]
 Women's Singles:  Anastasia Pavlyuchenkova [17],  Elena Vesnina [19],  Caroline Garcia [25],  Laura Siegemund [26],  Tímea Babos [31]
 Men's Doubles:  Raven Klaasen /  Rajeev Ram [7],  Henri Kontinen /  John Peers [10]
 Mixed Doubles:  Andrea Hlaváčková /  Łukasz Kubot [6]
 Schedule of Play

Day 7 (September 4) 
 Seeds out:
 Men's Singles:  Rafael Nadal [4],  Jack Sock [26]
 Women's Singles:  Madison Keys [8],  Johanna Konta [13],  Petra Kvitová [14]
 Women's Doubles:  Tímea Babos /  Yaroslava Shvedova [3],  Julia Görges /  Karolína Plíšková [8],  Vania King /  Monica Niculescu [10],  Xu Yifan /  Zheng Saisai [11]
 Mixed Doubles:  Sania Mirza /  Ivan Dodig [1],  Chan Hao-ching /  Max Mirnyi [5]
 Schedule of Play

Day 8 (September 5) 
 Seeds out:
 Men's Singles:  Dominic Thiem [8],  Ivo Karlović [21],  Grigor Dimitrov [22]
 Women's Singles:  Agnieszka Radwańska [4],  Venus Williams [6],  Carla Suárez Navarro [11]
 Men's Doubles:  Jean-Julien Rojer /  Horia Tecău [5]
 Women's Doubles:  Andrea Hlaváčková /  Lucie Hradecká [4]
 Schedule of Play

Day 9 (September 6) 
 Seeds out:
 Men's Singles:  Jo-Wilfried Tsonga [9],  Lucas Pouille [24]
 Women's Singles:  Roberta Vinci [7]
 Men's Doubles:  Bob Bryan /  Mike Bryan [3]
 Women's Doubles:  Sania Mirza /  Barbora Strýcová [7],  Andreja Klepač /  Katarina Srebotnik [13]
 Mixed Doubles:  Yaroslava Shvedova /  Bruno Soares [2]
 Schedule of Play

Day 10 (September 7) 
 Seeds out:
 Men's Singles:  Andy Murray [2]
 Women's Singles:  Simona Halep [5]
 Men's Doubles:  Łukasz Kubot /  Alexander Peya [12]
 Women's Doubles:  Barbora Krejčíková /  Kateřina Siniaková [16]
 Schedule of Play

Day 11 (September 8) 
 Seeds out:
 Women's Singles:  Serena Williams [1]
 Men's Doubles:  Pierre-Hugues Herbert /  Nicolas Mahut [1],  Feliciano López /  Marc López [8]
 Women's Doubles:  Ekaterina Makarova /  Elena Vesnina [5],  Martina Hingis /  Coco Vandeweghe [6]
 Schedule of Play

Day 12 (September 9) 
 Seeds out:
 Men's Singles:  Kei Nishikori [6],  Gaël Monfils [10]
 Mixed Doubles:  Coco Vandeweghe /  Rajeev Ram [7]
 Schedule of Play

Day 13 (September 10) 
 Seeds out:
 Women's Singles:  Karolína Plíšková [10]
 Schedule of Play

Day 14 (September 11) 
 Seeds out:
 Men's Singles:  Novak Djokovic [1]
 Women's Doubles:  Caroline Garcia /  Kristina Mladenovic [1]
 Schedule of Play

Day-by-day summaries
US Open (tennis) by year – Day-by-day summaries